Dumaria (also spelled Dumariya, Dumriya) is a village in the Dumaria CD block in the Ghatshila subdivision of the Purbi Singhum district in the Indian state of Jharkhand.

Geography

Location

Area overview
The area shown in the map “forms a part of the Chota Nagpur Plateau and is a hilly upland tract”.  The main rivers draining the district are the Subarnarekha and the Kharkai. The area lying between Jamshedpur and Ghatshila is the main industrial mining zone. The rest of the district is primarily agricultural. In the district, as of 2011,  56.9% of the population lives in the rural areas and a high 43.1% lives in the urban areas.

Note: The map alongside presents some of the notable locations in the district. All places marked in the map are linked in the larger full screen map.

Civic administration
There is a police station at Dumaria.

The headquarters of Dumaria CD block is located at Dumaria village.

Demographics
According to the 2011 Census of India, Dumariya had a total population of 1,507, of which 778 (52%) were males and 729 (48%) were females. Population in the age range 0–6 years was 187. The total number of literate persons in Dumariya was 1,010 (76.52% of the population over 6 years).

(*For language details see Dumaria block#Language and religion)

Education
Model School Dumaria is an English-medium coeducational institution established in 2011. It has facilities for teaching from class VI to class X.

Project Balika High School is a Hindi-medium girls only institution established in 1984. It has facilities for teaching in classes IX and X. The school has a playground and a library with 800 books.

References

Villages in East Singhbhum district